Greaser's Palace is a 1972 American Western film written and directed by Robert Downey Sr. It stars Allan Arbus as Jesse, a man with amnesia who heals the sick, resurrects the dead and tap dances on water on the American frontier. A parable based on the life of Jesus in the New Testament, the film has been described as an acid Western.

Plot
Jesse (Allan Arbus) paraglides into a town on the American frontier run by a saloon owner named Seaweedhead Greaser (Albert Henderson), a tyrant who collects the town's taxes while keeping his mother and favorite mariachi band in cages, and suffering from chronic constipation. Jesse has amnesia and remembers nothing except that he is anticipated by talent agent Morris, telling people that he's on his way to Jerusalem, where he will become a singer, dancer and actor. Greaser murders his son, Lamy Homo Greaser (Michael Sullivan), for being a homosexual, and Jesse resurrects the dead man.

Subsequently, Jesse heals the sick and tap dances on water. Greaser's saloon is losing money due to the declining popularity of his daughter Cholera (Luana Anders)'s performances, so he hires Jesse to sing and dance at the saloon. Jesse concludes his act with him bleeding stigmatically from his hands. The audience loves it, but the talent agent pans the act. Jesse begins a relationship with a woman (Elsie Downey) who ultimately crucifies him so he can resurrect her son (Robert Downey Jr.), who was killed by Indians.

Cast

Albert Henderson as Seaweedhead Greaser
Luana Anders as Cholera Greaser
James Antonio as Vernon
Allan Arbus as Jesse
Toni Basil as Indian Girl
Don Calfa as Morris
Woody Chambliss as Father
Pablo Ferro as Indian
Stanley Gottlieb as Spitunia
Joe Madden as Man With Painting
George Morgan as Coo Coo

Ron Nealy as Card Man / Ghost
Michael Sullivan as Lamy "Homo" Greaser
Hervé Villechaize as Mr. Spitunia
Lawrence Wolf as French Padre
Elsie Downey as The Woman
Jackson Haynes as Rope Man
Alex Hitchcock as Nun
John Paul Hudson as Smiley
Larry Moyer as Captain Good
Don Smolen as Gip
Rex King as Turquoise Skies

Cast notes:
Robert Downey Jr., the son of the writer-director of the film, has an uncredited role as a child. Elsie Downey who played "the Woman" was Robert Downey Sr.'s wife. Also in the cast were Allyson Downey and Stacy Sheehan, Downey Sr.'s daughter and niece.

Production
Greaser's Palace, which was shot on location in New Mexico, was produced by Cyma Rubin, a neophyte Broadway producer who gave Downey a million dollars to make the film.  Downey had previously made the cult hit Putney Swope (1969) as well as lesser-known films such as Pound (1970), Babo 73 (1964) and Chafed Elbows (1966).

Reception
Although Time magazine's Jay Cocks called it "Downey's funniest, most accomplished and most audacious film yet" and "the most adventurous American movie so far this year", Greaser's Palace did not receive generally good critical reviews. Thomas Meehan, writing in the Saturday Review said "Robert Downey seems to have absolutely everything it takes to be a successful movie director except talent," and thought that this film was "even worse than his earlier pictures – an absurdist, incomprehensible Western that mixes in scatology, William Morris agents and the second coming of Christ." Kevin Thomas, the critic for the Los Angeles Times wrote of it "...the film is so utterly devoid of wit and imagination that the unremitting gross behavior and language it wallows in is quickly revolting."  Kathleen Carroll, critic for the New York Daily News asked "Does this weird concoction of Harvard Lampoon parody, half-serious symbolism and silly slapstick really work?"

The film, which was presented at the Telluride Film Festival in 1976, was not a commercial success.

See also
 List of American films of 1972

References
Notes

External links
 
 
 

1972 films
1970s English-language films
1972 comedy films
1972 Western (genre) films
Films scored by Jack Nitzsche
Films directed by Robert Downey Sr.
Films with screenplays by Robert Downey Sr.
American Western (genre) comedy films
1970s American films
Acid Westerns